Evangelical means an adherent of Evangelicalism, the Protestant interdenominational religious movement with origins in First Great Awakening.

Evangelical or Evangelicals may also refer to:
Lutheranism, one of the largest branches of Protestantism
Pertaining to the gospel, the central message of Christianity
Pertaining to Protestantism, the branch of Christianity, e.g. Evangelical Lutheran, Evangelical Reformed, Evangelical Methodist
Low church, a reform movement within the Church of England
Evangelicals (band), an indie rock band

See also
Evangelism, preaching the Christian gospel
Evangelion (disambiguation)